Joshua Talau (born 19 April 1996) is a Papua New Guinean footballer who plays as a defender for Lae City FC in the NSL and the Papua New Guinea national football team. He made his debut for the national team in September 2014, age 18, against Singapore

Club
Talau played his club football for Besta United PNG in the Papua New Guinea National Soccer League. Besta United PNG is the national development team of the Papua New Guinea Football Association. In 2015, he moved to Lae City Dwellers with which he won the NSL. He also played during the 2016 OFC Champions League

International
In September 2014, Talau made his debut for Papua New Guinea, coming on as a substitute in a 2–1 loss to Singapore.

References

External links
 
 
 

1996 births
Living people
Papua New Guinean footballers
Papua New Guinea international footballers
People from the National Capital District (Papua New Guinea)
Association football defenders